Mahmudabad-e Now (also Romanized as Maḩmūdābād-e Now and Maḩmūdābād Now; also known as Maḩmūdābād and Mahūdābād Now) is a village in Jalilabad Rural District, Jalilabad District, Pishva County, Tehran Province, Iran. At the 2006 census, its population was 169, in 38 families.

References 

Populated places in Pishva County